The Vickers Type 559 was a supersonic interceptor aircraft design by the British aircraft company Vickers-Armstrongs and was their submission for Operational Requirement F.155 in 1955.

It was not accepted for further consideration; the most valued submissions being from Armstrong Whitworth and Fairey, however the F.155 requirement was dropped as a result of the 1957 Defence White Paper.

Design and development
The Type 559 was an unorthodox canard design with a massive chin air intake, split vertically, for two reheated de Havilland Gyron engines of  thrust each, placed as in the English Electric Lightning, one above the other. Two de Havilland Spectre Junior rockets were situated each side of the fuselage at wing level. Two Red Hebe or Blue Jay missiles were mounted alongside the upper part of the fuselage between the canard and the mainplane, which had endplates incorporating twin rudders.

Specifications

Notes

References

 Andrews, C.F. and E.B. Morgan. Supermarine Aircraft since 1914. London:Putnam, 1987. .
 Butler, Tony. "Futile Rivals: F.155T - The Quest for "An Ultimate in Interceptors"". Air Enthusiast, No. 61, January/February 1996. Stamford, UK:Key Publishing. . pp. 65–73.
 Buttler, Tony. British Secret Projects: Jet Fighters Since 1950. Leicester, UK: Midland Publishing, 2000, .

External links

 Type 559 page at VickersSupermarine.org.uk

Cancelled military aircraft projects of the United Kingdom
Delta-wing aircraft
1950s British fighter aircraft
Type 559
Canard aircraft
Twinjets
Mixed-power aircraft